The Bahr Yussef ("the waterway of Joseph") is a canal which connects the Nile River with Fayyum in Egypt.

In ancient times it was called Tomis by the Greeks which was derived from its Egyptian name Tm.t  "ending canal" and was still in use after the Arab conquest, translated into Arabic as al-Manhi. It was also known as "the Great canal" or "the canal of Moeris". The modern Arabic name refers to the prophet Yusuf, the Quranic counterpart of the Biblical Joseph.

In prehistoric times, the canal was a natural offshoot of the Nile which created a lake to the west during high floods. Beginning with the 12th dynasty, the waterway was enlarged and the Fayyum was developed to enlarge Lake Moeris. The canal was built into the natural incline of the valley, creating a channel 15 km long and 5 m deep that sloped into the Fayyum depression. The canal was controlled by the Ha-Uar Dam, which was actually two dams that regulated the flow into the lake and out of the Nile. As the surrounding area changed at about 230 BC, the Bahr Yussef eventually became neglected, leaving most of Lake Moeris to dry up creating the depression that exists today and the modern province of Al Fayyum.

During the medieval period, the canal was still a major communication axis to connect Fayyum to Cairo.

The Bahr Yussef still exists today, feeding water northwards into the Birket Qarun, parallel with the Nile.

See also
+Sakoula DNC

References 

 

Canals in Egypt
Faiyum
Faiyum Governorate
River bifurcations